The Ukrainian Basketball Cup (in Ukrainian: Кубок України з баскетболу) is an annual cup competition for basketball teams from Ukraine. The competition was founded in 1992.

Finals

Titles by team

Teams in italics are no longer active.

References

External links
Ukrainian Cup at FlashScore

Basketball competitions in Ukraine
Basketball cup competitions in Europe